Manuel Uruchurtu Ramírez (June 27, 1872 in Hermosillo, Sonora – April 15, 1912 in North Atlantic Ocean) was a lawyer and Mexican politician, known to be the only passenger of his nationality lost in the  disaster.

Biography 
Member of a Porfiriano oligarchy family (son of Captain Mateo Uruchurtu Díaz and Mercedes Ramírez Estrella), the young Uruchurtu travelled to Mexico City to study law. He married a fellow student, the aristocrat Gertrudis Caraza y Landero, with whom he had seven children. He and his family moved to Mexico City. His friendship with the prominent Porfirista and Científico Ramón Corral opened the doors to Mexico's political life. His close ties to the dictatorship forced him, upon the fall of the regime and banishment of Porfirio Díaz in 1911, to leave the country and take refuge in Europe.

In 1912 he visited his friend and political godfather in France, the also banished Ramón Corral. On March 1, Uruchurtu met with Corral. Upon completion of his assignment, the Sonoran acquired his ticket to travel on April 10 on the transatlantic liner Paris, from Cherbourg, France to Veracruz, Mexico.

At the end of March or the beginning of April of that year, Uruchurtu, who was staying at the Hotel París, was visited by Guillermo Obregón, son-in-law of Ramón Corral and president of the Great Commission of the Mexican Chamber of Deputies. Obregon had paid a little over £27 for a first-class ticket that would allow him to sail on the luxurious ocean liner  maiden voyage, but had changed his mind and wished to exchange tickets, to which Uruchurtu agreed; Guillermo Obregón would travel in the Paris and Uruchurtu in the Titanic with the ticket No. P C 17601.

On April 8, Uruchurtu was invited to a party with exiles loyal to Porfirio Díaz and on the 10th of the same month he sent a postcard to his mother in Hermosillo, telling her that the photograph on the postcard was more or less the ship in which he would travel, and that upon arriving in Mexico he would visit her in Hermosillo to tell her about the trip on the famous ship. That same day, in Cherbourg, he boarded the Titanic along with 273 other passengers.

After the wreck of the ship, the body of Uruchurtu was never recovered.

Folk tale 
During the following decades, an unsubstantiated account of Uruchurtu's final moments became popular in Mexico. The story claimed that on the night of the sinking of the Titanic, Uruchurtu had managed to find a seat on a lifeboat only to give it up in favor of a second-class lady named Elizabeth Ramell Nye (age 29) in a selfless act of chivalry.

Despite the fact that Nye's own detailed account of the events fail to even mention Uruchurtu, the story went unchallenged in Mexico until 2012, when writer Guadalupe Loaeza debunked it while promoting her novel The Gentleman of the Titanic. The fictional nature of the story has also been confirmed by Nye's biographer, David Bryceson, who called the story a "baseless...moving tale".

References 

Deaths on the RMS Titanic
20th-century Mexican lawyers
People from Hermosillo
1872 births
1912 deaths